Oreste Lionello (18 April 1927 – 19 February 2009) was an Italian actor and  voice actor.

Biography
Lionello was born in Rhodes (which was then a possession of Italy), to Calabrian parents, and grew up in Reggio Calabria. He began his career as a theatre actor, and was considered amongst the founders of Italian cabaret. In 1953 he entered the Musical Theatrical Company of RAI (Italian state TV) and the following year he debuted in television with Marziano Filippo, a boys' show. In the 1960s, he was one of the founders of the Bagaglino comic theatre and TV company and he had found success as an entertainer on Italian TV in the 1970s and 1980s. As an actor, Lionello acted in over 56 feature films and several television shows. He appeared in five episodes of Le avventure di Laura Storm and he made his debut film appearance in The Cheerful Squadron.

As a voice actor, Lionello was the official Italian voice of Woody Allen. Other actors he dubbed included Charlie Chaplin, Groucho Marx, Dick Van Dyke, Peter Sellers, Gene Wilder, Michel Serrault, Donald Pleasence, Clive Revill, Gérard Depardieu, Rick Moranis and Roman Polanski. He also dubbed Robin Williams as Mork in the first two seasons of Mork & Mindy. In his animated roles, Lionello dubbed popular animated characters for Disney and Warner Bros. between the 1950s and 1970s. He was considered a pioneer of Italian voice dubbing and founded the C.V.D. along with Renato Turi, Giancarlo Giannini, Valeria Valeri, Corrado Gaipa and other dubbers.

Personal life
Lionello was married with five children who followed in his footsteps. This includes Luca, Cristiana, Alessia and Davide, who are all actors and dubbers. His oldest son Fabio Luigi is a television director.

Death
Lionello died on 19 February 2009 in Rome at the age of 81 after a long illness and was buried at the Campo Verano. Allen later paid tribute to him in an interview.

After his death, the voice of Woody Allen was passed on to Leo Gullotta.

Filmography

Cinema

 The Cheerful Squadron (1954) - The Quartermaster's Assistant (uncredited)
 È arrivata la parigina (1958) - Basilio
 Devil's Cavaliers (1959) - Rollò, Stiller Henchman
 La cento chilometri (1959) - The Tram Passenger with Glasses (uncredited)
 Il Mattatore (1960) - Il Ragioniere (voice, uncredited)
 Toto, Fabrizi and the Young People Today (1960) - Student (uncredited)
 Le pillole di Ercole (1960) - Gino
 The Two Rivals (1960)
 Totòtruffa 62 (1961) - Pippo
 La voglia matta (1962) - Biondo (voice, uncredited)
 Nerone '71 (1962) - Aiutante della regista
 The Beast of Babylon Against the Son of Hercules (1963)
 The Swindlers (1963) - Ciocchi (segment "Medico e fidanzata")
 L'ultima carica (1964)
 Queste pazze pazze donne (1964) - Nannarella's Brother ('Il gentil sesso')
 Le sette vipere (Il marito latino) (1964) - Barbikian (voice, uncredited)
 The Magnificent Gladiator (1964) - Drusius
 Top Crack (1966) - Peter
 I due sanculotti (1966) - Napoleone
 Riderà! (Cuore matto) (1967) - Franco
 Il profeta (1968) - Puccio
 VIP my Brother Superman (1968) - Mini VIP (voice)
 I quattro del pater noster (1969) - Mambo
 Four Flies on Grey Velvet (1971) - The Professor
 The Case of the Bloody Iris (1972) - Arthur - Photographer
 Mamma... li turchi! (1973) - Mamma li Turchi
 The Sensual Man (1973) - Painter
 Provaci anche tu Lionel (1973) - Lionel Lionelli
 Le avventure di Barbapapà (1973) - Narrator (voice, uncredited)
 Antoine and Sebastian (1974) - Ledieu
 Sesso in testa (1974) - Epifanio
 Poker in Bed (1974) - Alberto
 I sette magnifici cornuti (1974) - Antonio
 The Sensual Man (1974)
 The Sex Machine (1975) - Driver
 Un sorriso, uno schiaffo, un bacio in bocca (1975) - (voice)
 Sexycop (1976) - Commissario Solmi
 Remo e Romolo (Storia di due figli di una lupa) (1976) - Etrusco
 Soldier of Fortune (1976) - Giovenale da Vetralla
 The Best (1976) - Amilcare Chiocchietti
 La prima notte di nozze (1976)
 My Sister in Law (1976) - Francesco Lo Presti
 Cassiodoro il più duro del pretorio (1976)
 Nerone (1977) - Seneca
 Per amore di Poppea (1977) - Nero
 Kakkientruppen (1977) - Ispettore generale
 Scherzi da prete (1978) - Spartaco De Simone
 Tutti a squola (1979) - Professore di scienze
 L'imbranato (1979)
 Ciao marziano (1980) - Il mafioso
 Quella peste di Pierina (1982) - Il Tigre
 Attenti a quei P2 (1982) - Licio Belli
 Biancaneve & Co... (1982) - Mago Magone
 Ti spacco il muso, bimba! (1982)
 Petomaniac (1983) - Narratore (uncredited)
 Sfrattato cerca casa equo canone (1983) - Il nonno
 Massimamente folle (1985)
 Dov'era Lei a quell'Ora? (1992) - Procuratore Capo
 Storie di Seduzione (1995) - Policeman
 I Fetentoni (1999)
 Opopomoz (2003) - Scarapino (voice)
 No Problem (2008) - Signor Pairo
 Postcards from Rome (2008) - The dog (voice) (final film role)

Dubbing roles

Animation
Z in Antz
Tibbs in One Hundred and One Dalmatians
Roquefort / Georges Hautecourt in The Aristocats
Boo-Boo Bear in Hey There, It's Yogi Bear!
Grand Duke in Cinderella (1967 redub)
Ziggy in The Jungle Book
Jeremy Hillary Boob in Yellow Submarine
Reverend Timms in Postman Pat
Mickey Mouse / Donald Duck in All Disney Productions (1950s-1970s)
Bugs Bunny / Daffy Duck / Sylvester in Looney Tunes (1950s-1970s)
Asterix in Asterix the Gaul
Asterix in Asterix and Cleopatra
Fritz the Cat in Fritz the Cat (1973 redub)
The Mouse in Goliath II

Live action
Victor Shakapopulis in What's New Pussycat?
Isaac Davis in Manhattan
Boris Grushenko in Love and Death
Howard Prince in The Front
Leonard Zelig in Zelig
Victor / Fabrizio / The Fool / Sperm in Everything You Always Wanted to Know About Sex* (*But Were Afraid to Ask)
Sandy Bates in Stardust Memories
Virgil Starkwell in Take the Money and Run
Miles Monroe in Sleeper
Fielding Mellish in Bananas
Alvy Singer in Annie Hall
Mickey Sachs in Hannah and Her Sisters
Sheldon Mills in New York Stories
Andrew in A Midsummer Night's Sex Comedy
Danny Rose in Broadway Danny Rose
Allan Felix in Play It Again, Sam
Joe in Radio Days
Cliff Stern in Crimes and Misdemeanors
Gabe Roth in Husbands and Wives
Lenny Weinrib in Mighty Aphrodite
Kleinman in Shadows and Fog
Nick Fifer in Scenes from a Mall
Larry Lipton in Manhattan Murder Mystery
Ray Winkler in Small Time Crooks
Joe Berlin in Everyone Says I Love You
Audition Director in The Impostors
Harry Block in Deconstructing Harry
Tex Cowley in Picking Up the Pieces
C.W. Briggs in The Curse of the Jade Scorpion
Val Waxman in Hollywood Ending
David Dobel in Anything Else
Sid Waterman in Scoop
Dr. Strangelove in Dr. Strangelove
Inspector Clouseau in Revenge of the Pink Panther
Sidney Wang in Murder by Death
Sir Guy Grand in The Magic Christian
Sam in The Optimists of Nine Elms
Robert Danvers in There's a Girl in My Soup
Dr. Frederick Frankenstein in Young Frankenstein
Phillipe / Claude in Start the Revolution Without Me
Quackser Fortune in Quackser Fortune Has a Cousin in the Bronx
The Fox in The Little Prince
Sigerson Holmes in The Adventure of Sherlock Holmes' Smarter Brother
Willy Wonka in Willy Wonka & the Chocolate Factory
Rudy Hickman in The World's Greatest Lover
George Caldwell in Silver Streak
Avram Belinski in The Frisco Kid
Michael Jordon in Hanky Panky
Skip Donahue in Stir Crazy
Gene Bergman in Something Wilder
Mork in Mork & Mindy (seasons 1–2)
Bert / Mr. Dawes Sr. in Mary Poppins
Louis Tully in Ghostbusters
Louis Tully in Ghostbusters II
Albin Mougeotte in La Cage aux Folles
Albin Mougeotte in La Cage aux Folles II
Albin Mougeotte in La Cage aux Folles 3: The Wedding
Otarius in Good King Dagobert
Leon De Paris in The Wolf and the Lamb
Gino in Merry Christmas... Happy New Year
Joy Boy in Pocketful of Miracles
Max Meen in The Great Race
J. Algernon Hawthorne / Cab Driver in It's a Mad, Mad, Mad, Mad World
Guy Gisborne in Robin and the 7 Hoods
Horatio Bixbee in Penelope
Milt Manville in Luv
Commissioner Juve in Fantomas Unleashed
Victor Pivert in The Mad Adventures of Rabbi Jacob
Charles Firbank in How to Murder Your Wife
Harold "Tiger" in A Guide for the Married Man
Police Inspector in Seven Times Seven
Police Commissioner Green in How to Kill 400 Duponts
Dr. Longstreet in The Abominable Dr. Phibes
Adenoid Hynkel / Jewish Barber in The Great Dictator (1972 redub)
John Christie in 10 Rillington Place
George in Cul-de-sac
Red Cloak in Eyes Wide Shut
Alfred in The Fearless Vampire Killers
John Correli in Basic Instinct
Rufus T. Firefly in Duck Soup
Ronald Kornblow in A Night in Casablanca (1970 redub)
Toymaker in Chitty Chitty Bang Bang
McTarry / Hadley in Casino Royale
Lab Technician Jennings in Revenge of the Creature
The Riddler in Batman
George Harrison in A Hard Day's Night
George Harrison in Help!
Carl Sweetchuck in Police Academy 2: Their First Assignment
Warren in Cracking Up
Bo Hopper in Hardly Working
Lucien Fougasse in The Gendarme Gets Married
Gardien in The Mona Lisa Has Been Stolen
Herbie Kazlminsky in 1941
Edwin Stewart in The Chase
Max in Midnight Express
Dave Hastings in The Sons of Katie Elder
Leonard in North by Northwest
P. R. Deltoid in A Clockwork Orange
Earnest Goodbody in How I Won the War
Sir Reginald Dongby in And the Ship Sails On
Mr. Bernstein in Citizen Kane (1965 redub)

Work as dubbing director
 BBC Television Shakespeare
 Crimes and Misdemeanors
 Ghostbusters II
 Hannah and Her Sisters
 Police Academy 3: Back in Training
 Police Academy 4: Citizens on Patrol  
 ''Police Academy 5: Assignment: Miami Beach'

References

External links

 
 
 
 
 

1927 births
2009 deaths
People from Rhodes
People from Reggio Calabria
Italian male voice actors
Italian male film actors
Italian male television actors
Italian male stage actors
Italian male comedians
20th-century Italian male actors
21st-century Italian male actors
Italian cabaret performers
Italian voice directors
People of Calabrian descent
Accademia Nazionale di Arte Drammatica Silvio D'Amico alumni
Commanders of the Order of Merit of the Italian Republic
Burials at Campo Verano
Italian impressionists (entertainers)